Starostin may refer to:

People
 Sergei Starostin (1953-2005), Russian linguistics researcher
 Georgiy Starostin (born 1976), his son, linguistics researcher and music critic
 Sergey Nikolaevich Starostin, Russian folk and jazz musician
 The Starostin brothers, Soviet/Russian association football players
 Nikolai Starostin (1902-1996)
 Andrey Starostin (1906-1987)
 Anatoli Starostin, Soviet/Russian modern pentathlete and Olympic champion

Other uses

See also
 Starostin's loach, a cave fish from central Asia